Jan Kronig (born 24 June 2000) is a Swiss footballer who plays for Aarau as a defender.

Professional career
On 12 June 2018, Kronig signed his first professional contract with Young Boys. Kronig made his professional debut with Young Boys in a 6-1 Swiss Super League win over on 16 May 2019.

On 10 July 2019, Kronig was loaned out to Schaffhausen for the rest of the season.

On 21 June 2021, he signed a three-year contract with Aarau.

References

External links
 
 BSCYB Profile
 SFV U16 Profile
 SFV U17 Profile
 SFV U18 Profile
 SFV U19 Profile

2000 births
Living people
People from Brig-Glis
Swiss men's footballers
Switzerland youth international footballers
Switzerland under-21 international footballers
Association football defenders
BSC Young Boys players
FC Schaffhausen players
FC Wil players
FC Aarau players
Swiss Super League players
Swiss Challenge League players
Sportspeople from Valais